Queensway Base is the headquarters that is home to the Special Operations Command (SOC), a front line department of the Singapore Police Force (SPF). It is situated directly across Queensway, and was formerly the Old Queenstown Police Station. Units such as Police Light Strike Force, Police KINS Training Camp, Police Tactical Unit, STAR (Special Tactics And Rescue) unit and some SOC units are located here.

References

External links
List of contact information

Singapore Police Force
Special Operations Command (Singapore)